Hierotheos the Thesmothete is the reputed first head and bishop of the Christian Athenians. The title thesmothete means ruler, or junior archon, of Athens (literally "rule-setter").

Biography 

Little is known of Hierotheos (Ἰερόθεος "sanctified by God"); church tradition holds that he was one of the learned men in the city of Athens. He was instructed in Christianity by the Apostle Paul, who baptized and ordained him around the year 52 AD. Hierotheos frequently visited and instructed St Dionysius the Areopagite. There is disagreement as to whether Hierotheos was actually a priest or bishop; some traditions describe Dionysius as the first bishop of Athens.

According to Dionysius (On the Divine Names, 3:2), Hierotheos was an accomplished hymnographer:
"He was wholly transported, wholly outside himself and was so deeply absorbed in communion with the sacred things he celebrated in hymnology, that to all who heard him and saw him and knew him, and yet knew him not, he seemed to be inspired of God, a divine hymnographer."
In more recent years, some have pointed that the name 'Hierotheos' is unique in Greek literature, nor is included in the extremely wide list of proper name known from papyri. The only record of this name is found in a Greek inscription from Athens.

Hierotheos and the Dormition of the Theotokos 

Hierotheos stood in the midst of the apostles and comforted them with spiritual songs and hymns which he sang accompanied with musical instruments.

See also
Early centers of Christianity: Greece

References 

Doctors of the Church
1st-century bishops in Roman Achaea
1st-century Christian saints
Bishops of Athens
Eastern Catholic saints
Clergy from Athens